Murray (The Murray until 1910) is an electoral district in the Australian state of New South Wales.

Murray is a regional electorate lying in the southwestern corner of the state. It encompasses several local government areas, namely Wentworth Shire, Balranald Shire, Carrathool Shire, the City of Griffith, Leeton Shire, Hay Shire, Murrumbidgee Shire, Murray River Council, Edward River Council and Berrigan Shire.

History
Murray was a single-member electorate from 1859 to 1880, returning two members from 1880 to 1894, returning to a single member electorate from 1894 to 1920. The district created in 1859 included the districts surrounding the towns of Deniliquin, Moama and Moulamein. It was substantially re-created in 1904 as a result of the 1903 New South Wales referendum, which required the number of members of the Legislative Assembly to be reduced from 125 to 90. The member for The Murray from 1894 to 1904 was James Hayes who was appointed to the Legislative Council and did not contest the election.

The district re-created in 1904 consisted of the abolished seat of Wentworth and parts of The Lachlan and the abolished seat of Hay. The member for Wentworth was Robert Scobie (Labour). The member for The Lachlan was James Carroll (Progressive) who unsuccessfully contested that seat. The member for Hay was Frank Byrne who did not contest the election.

From 1920 to 1927 it returned three members, having merged with Albury, Corowa and Wagga Wagga, voting by proportional representation. It returned to being a single-member electorate from 1927. Murray was abolished in 1999 when it was merged with Broken Hill to create Murray-Darling.

Murray was recreated for the 2015 state election, combining the southern part of the abolished district of Murray-Darling and the western part of the abolished district of Murrumbidgee.

Members for Murray

Election results

References

Murray
1859 establishments in Australia
Murray
1999 disestablishments in Australia
Murray
2015 establishments in Australia
Murray